Lypovets Raion was one of raions of Vinnytsia Oblast, located in southwestern Ukraine. The administrative center of the raion was the town of Lypovets. The raion was abolished and its territory was merged into Vinnytsia Raion on 18 July 2020 as part of the administrative reform of Ukraine, which reduced the number of raions of Vinnytsia Oblast to six. The last estimate of the raion population was

History 
During Holodomor more than 30 thousand people in Lypovets Raion died (population in 1932 was 105,394 inhabitants and in 1934 there lived the rest 74965 people).

References

Former raions of Vinnytsia Oblast
1923 establishments in Ukraine
Ukrainian raions abolished during the 2020 administrative reform